Oki Dwi Putra Senjaya (born 23 October 1983) is an Indonesian professional football referee.

References 

1983 births
Living people
Indonesian football referees
People from Bandung